HMS K7 was a K class submarine built by HM Dockyard, Devonport. She was laid down on 8 November 1915 and commissioned in July 1917.

K7 was the only one of the disastrous K class to engage with an enemy; on 16 June 1917 she fired a salvo of torpedoes at the U-boat U-95 and scored a direct hit. However, the torpedo failed to explode with what has been described as typical "K" luck; K-7 escaped retaliation by steaming away at speed.

K7 was involved in an accident with the 4th Light Cruiser Squadron. She was also involved in the catastrophic series of accidents during a night exercise that came to be known sarcastically as the Battle of May Island; K7 was damaged by running over the sinking . K7 was sold on 9 September 1921 at Sunderland.

Design
K7 displaced  when at the surface and  while submerged. The submarine was powered by two oil-fired Yarrow Shipbuilders boilers supplying one geared Brown-Curtis or Parsons steam turbine that developed 10,500 ship horsepower (7,800 kW) to drive two  screws. Submerged power came from four electric motors each producing . It also had an  diesel engine to be used when steam was being raised, or instead of raising steam.

K7 was armed with ten  torpedo tubes, two  deck guns, and a  anti-aircraft gun. Its torpedo tubes were fitted to the bows, the midship section, and two were mounted on the deck. Its complement was fifty-nine crew members.

References

Bibliography
 

 

British K-class submarines
Royal Navy ship names
1916 ships
Maritime incidents in 1918